Rossa mac Tomáis Óig Mág Uidhir (Sometimes Anglicised to Ross Maguire) was Bishop of Clogher from his appointment on 21 July 1447 until his death in 1483.

References

15th-century Roman Catholic bishops in Ireland
Pre-Reformation bishops of Clogher
1483 deaths